John Rochester (c. 1498–1537) was an English Catholic priest, Carthusian monk and martyr. He was hanged at York for refusing to concede King Henry VIII's supremacy over the church.

Background
The government was at first anxious to secure the public acquiescence of the monks of the London Charterhouse regarding royal supremacy in ecclesiastical matters, since for the austerity and sincerity of their mode of life they enjoyed great prestige. Having failed in this, the only alternative was to annihilate the resistance since a refusal engaged the prestige of the monks in the opposite sense. On 4 May 1535 the authorities sent to their death at Tyburn Tree three leading English Carthusians, John Houghton, prior of the London house, Robert Lawrence and Augustine Webster, respectively priors of Beauvale and Axholme. Little more than a month later, it was the turn of three leading monks of the London house: Humphrey Middlemore, William Exmew and Sebastian Newdigate, who were to die at Tyburn Tree on 19 June. This process of attrition was to claim as its victims no less than fifteen of the London Carthusians.

Life
John was the third son of John Rochester, of Terling, Essex, and Grisold Writtle, daughter of Walter Writtle, of Bobbingworth. He was the brother of Sir Robert Rochester, Comptroller of the Household and a member of the Privy Council under Queen Mary.

He joined the Carthusians, was a choir monk of the Charterhouse in London, and strenuously opposed the new doctrine of the royal supremacy.

Four more monks of the London community were seized; two being taken to the Carthusian house at Beauvale in Nottinghamshire, while Dom John Rochester and Dom James Walworth were taken to the Charterhouse of St. Michael in Hull, Yorkshire.

Pilgrimage of Grace
That autumn, the government had just succeeded in putting down a rising in Lincolnshire, when on 13 October 1536, the far more serious Pilgrimage of Grace broke out, mustering an enormous multitude of adherents, perhaps as many as 40,000. This time, having dealt with the problem, the government was desperate to stamp out any centres of resistance. Since one of the flashpoints had been the Northern capital of York, it was necessary for the government to mount a lesson in the city.

Executions
The two London monks were brought from Hull to York and brought before the Lord President of the North, the Duke of Norfolk, on trumped up treason charges. Condemned to death, they provided the desired menacing spectacle for the city when on 11 May 1537 both were hanged and their bodies hung in chains from the city battlements until they fell to pieces.

From arrest to death the two monks were inseparable companions in the same fate. They were both beatified by Pope Leo XIII in 1888.

References

Sources

1490s births
1537 deaths
Carthusian Martyrs of London
English beatified people
Carthusian saints
Martyred Roman Catholic priests
16th-century English clergy
People executed under the Tudors for treason against England
People from Terling
Executed people from Essex
16th-century English Roman Catholic priests
16th-century Roman Catholic martyrs
16th-century venerated Christians
People executed by the Kingdom of England by hanging
People executed under Henry VIII
Forty-one Martyrs of England and Wales